Fedir Abramov (March 21, 1904 in Lysychansk – December 5, 1982 in Dnipropetrovsk) was a Ukrainian geologist and mining specialist. He was a member of the Academy of Sciences of the Ukrainian SSR. His works dealt with problems of ventilation and aerogas dynamics of mines, and the prevention of sudden emissions of coal, rock and gas.

Biography 
In 1930 he graduated from the Dnepropetrovsk Mining Institute, where he would later return as a teacher. He participated in the Second World War.

From 1940 to 1969, with a break from 1941-1944, Abramov headed the Department of Aerology and Occupational Safety of the National Mining University.

In 1952 he defended his doctoral dissertation, which was devoted to the study of aerodynamics of vertical shafts of mines with new types of reinforcement.

In 1962 he began working at the Institute of Geotechnical Mechanics of the USSR Academy of Sciences.

Until 1982 he headed the department of mine aerogas and thermodynamics of the Institute of Geotechnical Mechanics.

Research and Innovations

His department developed the techniques needed for the rapid construction of the Moscow metro in the 1950s.

He supervised the research covered in the "Handbook of Mine Ventilation", with a creative team that included OS Gershun, BE Gretzinger, VA Dolinsky, AF Miletich, LP Romensky, V. E. Streimann, MV Shibka, GA Shevelev.

He is the founder of a scientific school in the field of mine ventilation.

He was the first in the USSR to substantiate and prove in practice the economic and technical feasibility of using individual fasteners for cleaning the face of Donbas mines.

He developed a method of control-depressive survey of ventilation of mines and quarries.

He proposed a wedge principle of extracting metal risers, which was later introduced in the minds of Donbas.

He was the initiator and one of the developers of a series of modeling devices implemented in industry.

Under his leadership:

 created aerodynamic means of regulating air flow at production sites,
 mathematical substantiation of transient aerogas-dynamic processes is carried out,
 developed algorithms and programs for calculating mine ventilation,
 the theoretical bases of electric modeling of mine ventilation networks are laid.
He was awarded the Order of Lenin, orders and medals, the State Prize of the USSR in 1976 - for the development and implementation of methods for overcoming the gas barrier, which provides a heavily polluted mines lava load of more than 1,000 tons per day.

His inventions "Method of measuring methane flow rates from degassing wells" were registered in co-authorship with Frundin, "Intrinsically safe methanometer with a unified output".

References
Encyclopedia of Ukraine

Ukrainian geologists
Dnipro Polytechnic alumni
1904 births
1982 deaths
People from Lysychansk
Members of the National Academy of Sciences of Ukraine
Soviet geologists